Twemlow Hall is a country house standing on a former moated site in the parish of Twemlow, Cheshire, England.  It dates from the 17th century, and was "much altered" in 1810 for William Bache Booth.  It was altered again in 1974.  The house is constructed in brick on a stone plinth.  It has flush stone quoins and a slate roof.  It has two storeys, and a symmetrical entrance front of five bays, three of which are gabled.  Above the doorway are the arms of the Booth family.  The windows are sashes.  The house is recorded in the National Heritage List for England as a designated Grade II listed building.  Three structures associated with the hall forming three sides of a former stable yard are also listed at Grade II.

See also

Listed buildings in Twemlow

References

Houses completed in the 17th century
Houses completed in 1810
Country houses in Cheshire
Grade II listed buildings in Cheshire
Grade II listed houses